Fitzgerald Joseph (born 13 May 1967) is a Belizean former cyclist. He competed in two events at the 1988 Summer Olympics: men's individual road race and men's team time trial.

References

External links
 

1967 births
Living people
Belizean male cyclists
Olympic cyclists of Belize
Cyclists at the 1988 Summer Olympics
Place of birth missing (living people)